Jesper Stålheim (born 23 March 1988) is a Swedish competitive sailor. He competed at the 2016 Summer Olympics in Rio de Janeiro, in the men's Laser class where he finished in 16th place.

He has qualified to represent Sweden at the 2020 Summer Olympics in the men's Laser class.

References

External links

1988 births
Living people
Swedish male sailors (sport)
Olympic sailors of Sweden
Sailors at the 2016 Summer Olympics – Laser
Sailors at the 2020 Summer Olympics – Laser
Sportspeople from Karlstad